WECI (91.5 FM) is a public radio station  broadcasting a Variety format, and licensed to Richmond, Indiana, United States.  The student-run station is currently owned by Earlham College, though some of the DJs are from the Richmond community. The station is a Pacifica Radio affiliate station.

References

External links

Radio stations in Richmond, Indiana
College radio stations in Indiana
Earlham College